Jefferson Township is one of nine townships in Wells County, Indiana, United States. As of the 2010 census, its population was 5,762 and it contained 2,366 housing units.

Geography

Cities, towns, villages
 Ossian

Unincorporated towns
 Greenwood at 
 Kingsland at 
 Tocsin at 
(This list is based on USGS data and may include former settlements.)

Adjacent townships
 Pleasant Township, Allen County (north)
 Marion Township, Allen County (northeast)
 Preble Township, Adams County (east)
 Kirkland Township, Adams County (southeast)
 Lancaster Township (south)
 Rockcreek Township (southwest)
 Union Township (west)
 Lafayette Township, Allen County (northwest)

Cemeteries
The township contains these three cemeteries: El Honan, Oak Lawn and Prairie View.

Lakes
 Moser Lake

School districts
 Northern Wells Community Schools

Political districts
 Indiana's 6th congressional district
 State House District 79
 State House District 82
 State Senate District 19

References
 United States Census Bureau 2007 TIGER/Line Shapefiles
 United States Board on Geographic Names (GNIS)
 IndianaMap

External links
 Indiana Township Association
 United Township Association of Indiana

Townships in Wells County, Indiana
Fort Wayne, IN Metropolitan Statistical Area
Townships in Indiana